TBC1 domain family member 15 is a protein that in humans is encoded by the TBC1D15 gene.

References

Further reading